South Cumberland Islands is a national park in Queensland, Australia, 831 km northwest of Brisbane. It is famous for the marine stingers which can be found in the waters of the park between October and May.

Islands
Islands that are protected within the park include (portion of) Keswick Island, St Bees Island, Cockermouth Island, and Scawfell Island (formerly named L Island), which is the largest in the group.

Scawfell Island

It was originally part of the Cumberland Isles Group identified by Captain James Cook in 1770, but was not named. The island is one of the Cumberland Isles, later known as Whitsundays, and is now part of the South Cumberland Islands. It was later renamed as Scawfell Island in 1879, by Staff Commander E. P. Bedwell of the Royal Navy,  who surveyed and named many islands of the Whitsundays in 1879 in SS Llewellyn. The name of the island originates from England's second highest peak, Scafell, in Cumbria, which was then spelt "Scawfell".

It is the largest national park island in the South Cumberland group, and is uninhabited. Large areas of tropical rainforest cover steep mountain slopes. There is a coral fringing reef.

Refuge Bay on Scawfell Island provides good anchorage and fishing is permitted here. Bush camping is permitted on Scawfell Island but visitors must be self-sufficient, and a permit is required from Queensland National Parks. Camping is at sheltered sites in Refuge Bay.

In February 2023, a report by Dr Conrad Hoskin reported the finding of the Scawfell Island leaf-tailed gecko (Phyllurus fimbriatus), growing to 15 cm.

St Bees Island
St Bees Island is the 2nd largest island in the group , and is populated by a family living at Homestead Bay on the island.

See also

 List of islands of Australia
 Protected areas of Queensland

References

National parks of Queensland
North Queensland
Islands of Queensland